Mariusz Fyrstenberg and Marcin Matkowski were the defending champions, but declined to participate to focus for the 2004 Summer Olympics.

František Čermák and Leoš Friedl won the title by defeating Martín García and Sebastián Prieto 2–6, 6–2, 6–3 in the final.

Seeds

Draw

Draw

References
 Main Draw

Orange Warsaw Open
2004 ATP Tour